This is a list of bands, and in some cases musicians, from the city of Gothenburg in Sweden.

Lists of bands